Vladimir Tikhonov (born 31 October 1956) is a Russian gymnast. He competed in eight events at the 1976 Summer Olympics, winning a silver medal in the team event.

References

1956 births
Living people
Russian male artistic gymnasts
Olympic gymnasts of the Soviet Union
Gymnasts at the 1976 Summer Olympics
Sportspeople from Grozny
Olympic silver medalists for the Soviet Union
Olympic medalists in gymnastics
Medalists at the 1976 Summer Olympics
Soviet male artistic gymnasts
European champions in gymnastics